Henrik Krøyer Holme is a small group of uninhabited islands of Greenland within Northeast Greenland National Park. The area was formerly part of Avannaa, originally Nordgrønland ("North Greenland"), a former county of Greenland until 31 December 2008.

The Henrik Krøyer Holme group is an Important Bird Area where the ivory gull breeds.

Geography
This cluster of small islands is located in the Wandel Sea off the coast of Amdrup Land. The waters around the islands are part of the North East Water polynya, a seasonal area of open water surrounded by ice.

See also
List of islands of Greenland

References

Uninhabited islands of Greenland
Important Bird Areas of Greenland
Important Bird Areas of Arctic islands